Lat Krabang is one of the eastern districts of Bangkok.

Geography & history
Lat Krabang (literally translating to "slope of shield") is a second largest district of Bangkok (the first one is neighbouring district Nong Chok).

Neighbouring districts are (from the south clockwise): Bang Bo, Bang Sao Thong and Bang Phli (Samut Prakan province); Prawet, Saphan Sung, Min Buri and Nong Chok (Bangkok) and Mueang Chachoengsao (Chachoengsao province).

Two-thirds of the district is farmland. Another part is the industrial park and residential area. Therefore, it is filled with ditches and canals, Khlong Prawet Burirom is a main waterway. The identity of the district is that local culture and the way of life are based on canal culture, even now it is still local way of life since there is no road access in certain areas. Some people use boats and walkways along canal's bank.

At present, Lat Krabang is still considered one of the areas of Bangkok that still has rice cultivation as well as nearby districts were Min Buri and Nong Chok. In the past, some people traded rice by boat, they manually used big baskets for loading rice to their boats and unloaded it at the rice mill. They had workers and can only plant rice once a year. The harvest season is late November or December, it took a long time to manually harvest. There was no machinery back then. After harvesting, farmers had to carry them back so it would take six, seven or ten days of hard work. They worked so hard with some help from their buffaloes. Lat Krabang's rice fields consist of a wide of rice varieties.

The rowboat is an important local vehicle before 1992. Before that, anytime when someone died, those boats would be used to carry a coffin to the temple. It is also used as an important vehicle for other important religious ceremonies, such as ordaining monks.

In October 2005, the plan to create the special administrative area Nakhon Suvarnabhumi around Suvarnabhumi Airport became public. Lat Krabang was among the five districts that were to be included in this new administrative area.

Administration
The district is divided into six sub-districts (khwaengs).

Places
King Mongkut's Institute of Technology Lat Krabang
Protpittayapayat School
 Lat Krabang Industrial Estate
Hua Takhe

References

External links
District office

 
Districts of Bangkok